Playthings of Hollywood is a 1930 American romantic drama film directed by William A. O'Connor and starring Phyllis Barrington, Rita La Roy, Sheila Bromley and Donald Reed. Made by the independent producer Willis Kent during the early years of sound, it is also known by the alternative title Chiselers of Hollywood. It was made at the Tec-Art Studio in Hollywood on a very short shooting schedule. Kent originally intended to call the film Gold Diggers of Hollywood but abandoned this after Warner Brothers complained the title was too similar to Gold Diggers of Broadway.

Synopsis
Three sisters head to Hollywood looking to enjoy success. One of them finds work in the Film industry, while two of them fall in love with the same man, the son of a wealthy oil magnate.

Cast
 Phyllis Barrington as Roxanne King	
 Rita La Roy as Virginia King
 Sheila Bromley as Beth King
 Donald Reed	as Barry Gaynor
 Charles Delaney	 as Deputy
 Edmund Breese	
 Jack Richardson
 Dell Henderson	
 Syd Saylor

References

Bibliography
 Pitts, Michael R. Poverty Row Studios, 1929–1940. McFarland & Company, 2005.

External links
 

1930 films
1930 drama films
1930s English-language films
American drama films
Films directed by William A. O'Connor
American black-and-white films
Films set in Los Angeles
1930s American films